This is a list of tennis players who have represented the South Africa Davis Cup team in an official Davis Cup match. South Africa have taken part in the competition since 1913.

Players

References

Lists of Davis Cup tennis players
Davis Cup
 Davis Cup